Olivier Rolin (born 14 May 1947, in Boulogne-Billancourt) is a French writer.
He won the Prix Femina in 1994, for his novel Port-Soudan.

His brother Jean is also a writer and journalist.

References

External links
Official website

People from Boulogne-Billancourt
1947 births
Living people
École Normale Supérieure alumni
Officiers of the Ordre des Arts et des Lettres
20th-century French novelists
21st-century French novelists
Prix Femina winners
Prix Louis Guilloux winners
Prix France Culture winners
French Maoists